Dirga bin Surdi (born 11 July 1999) is a Malaysian professional footballer who plays as a winger for Malaysia Super League side Sabah and the Malaysia national team.

References

External links
 

Living people
Malaysian footballers
Malaysia Super League players
PDRM FA players
UiTM FC players
Sabah F.C. (Malaysia) players
Association football forwards
1999 births
People from Sabah